The 1969 Cal Poly Pomona Broncos football team represented California State Polytechnic College, Kellogg-Voorhis—now known as California State Polytechnic University, Pomona—as a member of the California Collegiate Athletic Association (CCAA) during the 1969 NCAA College Division football season. Led by first-year head coach Roy Anderson, Cal Poly Pomona compiled an overall record of 2–8 with a mark of 1–2 in conference play, placing third in the CCAA. The team was outscored by its opponents 287 to 110 for the season. The Broncos played home games at Kellogg Field in Pomona, California.

CCAA football changed significantly in 1969. Three teams—Fresno State, Long Beach State, and Cal State Los Angeles—left the conference and moved up to NCAA University Division competition, joining in the newly-formed Pacific Coast Athletic Association. They were replaced by Cal Poly Pomona and UC Riverside. Cal State Fullerton joined in 1970. Cal Poly Pomona had joined the CCAA in 1967, but its football team was not considered a conference member since they did not play a full slate of conference games in 1967 or 1968.

Schedule

References

Cal Poly Pomona
Cal Poly Pomona Broncos football seasons
Cal Poly Pomona Broncos football